Eva Loseth (born December 20, 1968 in Chicago, Illinois, US) is an American actress who made many guest starring appearances in several popular television shows of the 1990s.

She guest starred in Saved by the Bell, Quantum Leap, Doogie Howser, M.D., Silk Stalkings, Weird Science, Diagnosis: Murder and in the Star Trek: Deep Space Nine episode "Life Support".

Loseth's motion picture credits include Art House (1998) and The Dead Girl (2006).

As of 2015 she was working as a real estate agent in Chicago.

External links

References

1968 births
Living people
American film actresses
American television actresses
21st-century American women